Rich James Moran is a former guard in the National Football League who played nine seasons for the Green Bay Packers.

References

1962 births
Living people
American football offensive linemen
Green Bay Packers players
San Diego State Aztecs football players